.km is the Internet country code top-level domain (ccTLD) for Comoros.

Registration is available directly at second-level or under a number of sub-domains (cost of KMF30000 in most categories):
 .km – Companies and trademarks registered at second-level (at an annual cost of KMF50000).
 .com.km – Companies (unrestricted use).
 .coop.km – Co-operatives.
 .asso.km – Associations.
 .nom.km – Individuals («nom» means "name").
 .presse.km – Press organisations.
 .tm.km – Trademark owners.
 .medecin.km – Medical doctors.
 .notaires.km – Notaries.
 .pharmaciens.km – Pharmacists.
 .veterinaire.km – Veterinarians.
 .edu.km – Universities and professional institutes.
 .gouv.km – Government.
 .mil.km – Registered at no charge, for the military.

Second-level registrations are subject to restrictions and local presence requirements.

Third-level registrations are unrestricted in *.com.km if the name is not already registered elsewhere in .km; various category-specific restrictions apply to each of the other third-level domains. Personal name *.nom.km registrations are limited to island residents and to citizens resident abroad; various categories corresponding to the individual professions each require the applicant hold a license to practise that profession.

External links
 IANA .km whois information
 .km domain registration website 

Country code top-level domains
Communications in the Comoros

sv:Toppdomän#K